The women's individual compound archery competition at the 2017 Summer Universiade was held in the National Taiwan Sport University Stadium, Taipei, Taiwan between August 20 and 21, 2017, and the finals on the August 23.

Records 
Prior to the competition, the world and Universiade records were as follows.

72 arrows ranking round

15 arrows final match

Ranking round 

The ranking round took place on 20 August 2017 to determine the seeding for the elimination rounds. It consisted of two rounds of 36 arrows, with a maximum score of 720.

Elimination rounds

Section 1

Section 2

Section 3

Section 4

Finals

References 

Women's individual compound